Entente Sportive et Athlétique de Linas-Montlhéry is a football club based in the towns of Linas and Montlhéry in France. As of the 2022–23 season, it competes in the Championnat National 3, the fifth tier of the French football league system. The club's colors are   yellow, and its nickname is Sang et Or, meaning Blood and Gold.

History 
Linas-Montlhéry was founded in 1960 as a result of the merging of two clubs, US Linas and ES Montlhéry.

The club gained notable attention after being drawn against French champions Paris Saint-Germain (PSG) in the round of 64 of the 2019–20 Coupe de France. The match took place on 5 January 2020 at the Stade Robert Bobin, and ended in a 6–0 victory for PSG. Unfortunately for Linas-Montlhéry, they had a penalty saved by PSG's goalkeeper Sergio Rico when the score was 1–0. After the end of the 2019–20 season was cancelled due to the COVID-19 pandemic, Linas-Montlhéry sat top of their group in the Régional 1. They were subsequently promoted to the Championnat National 3, the fifth division in the French football pyramid.

On 13 November 2021, Linas-Montlhéry eliminated Ligue 2 side Dunkerque in the seventh round of the 2021–22 Coupe de France. The match ended in a 1–0 victory for ESALM after a late goal from Tom Bouvil. Goalkeeper Ali Lutumba made several "heroic" saves to stop Dunkerque from scoring. On 19 December, Linas-Montlhéry eliminated Ligue 1 club Angers in the round of 64 thanks to two goals from Pascal Leno. In the round of 32, Sang-et-Or were knocked out by Ligue 2 side Amiens; the Somme side took a 3–0 lead, only to concede three Linas-Montlhéry goals to bring the match to a penalty shoot-out. Amiens eventually won the shoot-out by a score of 4–3.

Stadium 
The club is a resident of both the Stade Paul Desgouillons and the Stade Cosom, although the Stade Paul Desgouillons is the main venue at which the club play at. The Stade Cosom has a capacity of 1,000.

In 2020, the Stade Paul Desgouillons was renovated, in order for Linas-Montlhéry to not be relegated.

Tanguy Ndombele is an icon of Linas-Montlhéry, and the club has put up a poster of him in the Stade Paul Desgouillons, just like several other notable former youth players.

Players

Squad

Notable former players 

  Dylan Bahamboula
  Plaisir Bahamboula
  Claude Bakadal
  Paul Bernardoni
  Mickaël Dogbé
  Chris Gadi
  Jules Iloki
  Djegui Koita
  Jean-Victor Makengo
  Tanguy Ndombele
  Randy Nteka
  Paul-Georges Ntep
  Mickaël Panos
  William Rémy
  Gime Touré
  Yoane Wissa

Honours

References

External links 
 Official club website (in French)

Linas
Linas
1960 establishments in France
Association football clubs established in 1960
Linas